Lin Jianhui, also known as Eric Lim, (born 11 August 1982), is a Malaysian singer, who got his break at the Astro Talent Quest competition in 2001 when he emerged as the champion of the competition. His favorite saying is "What time is it? ... Oooooh baby, it's grind time."

Album
 2005 – 左边
 2006 – 右边
 2009 – 我听见有人叫你宝贝
 2012 – 好流氓

References

External links
 Eric Lim Blog
 Eric Lim Album Lyrics
 All about Eric Lim

1982 births
Living people
Malaysian people of Chinese descent
Malaysian Mandopop singers
Malaysian male pop singers